Rhys Moller (born 12 January 1989) is an Australian motorcycle racer. He has been a competitor in his home Grand Prix in the 125cc World Championship as a wild card rider.

Career statistics

Grand Prix motorcycle racing

By season

Races by year

References

External links
 Profile on MotoGP.com

1989 births
Living people
Australian motorcycle racers
125cc World Championship riders
Sportspeople from Ballarat